Germany at the 2006–2008 European Nations Cup was the first time since 1981 that the German national rugby union team reached highest level of FIRA rugby, the European Nations Cup, by winning its group, the Division 2A in 2006–2008.

Germany played eight competition games and three friendlies in its campaign. It won six of its eight competitive games, including all four home games, and all three friendlies. It played Switzerland twice, to contest the newly created Alpencup, which remained with Germany on both occasions.

With over 8,000 spectators, Germany's home game against the Netherlands in Hanover, at the Rudolf-Kalweit-Stadion,  achieved the best crowd figures for a rugby match in Germany since the pre-Second World War days.

Germany went into its campaign unbeaten at home, having last lost on 12 November 2000, to the Ukraine.

Background
The division Germany was playing in, Division 2A, consisted of five teams, of which Ukraine had been relegated to from the First Division in the previous edition of the European Nations Cup.

The winner, Germany, earned promotion to the First Division, while the last placed team, the Netherlands, were relegated to Division 2B.

Management and coaching
At the beginning of Germany's ENC campaign, it was coached by a duo, made up of Rudolf Finsterer and Mark Kuhlmann, under the supervision of Peter Ianusevici, Germany's Director of Rugby.

In early 2008, the two were joined by Frenchman Bruno Stolorz. Stolorz was seconded to the German team by the Fédération française de rugby to improve Germany's performance in the sport and is also a coach with French club team RC Orléans, where he fulfills the position of a Conseiller sportif auprès.

Debuts and retirements
A number of German players made their final appearances for their country during the 2006-08 campaign, among them were regulars like Steffen Thier, Sascha Fischer and Klaus Mainzer.

The former were replaced by a number of debutants, among them the Zimbabwean Edmoore Takaendesa and the Australian Steve Williams.

Table

 In the event of a tie the following rules apply: champion to be decided by 1. Winner of the games between tied teams 2. Best difference points for and against in all pool matches 3. Best difference between tried in all pool matches 4. Higher number of points 5. Higher number of tries 
Germany was promoted because they won on aggregate in the two games played between them and Belgium (32 - 13 and 18 - 32 giving an aggregate of 50 - 45).

Games

ENC matches

Friendlies

Player statistics

Squad
The following players were part of the German team during its 2006-08 campaign:

 Clubs listed are the club or clubs a player played for while playing for Germany in 2006-08, not current club.

Games
The following players have been selected for Germany from 2006 to 2008 in the country's European Nation Cup Second Division campaign and in friendlies:

 Number of caps as of end of ENC campaign, 26 April 2008, not overall.
 1 Clemens von Grumbkow was injured prior to the match and Germany only went with 21 players into the game.
 2 Only squad known for the Switzerland game, no positions.
 Bold numbers indicate player played in the game.
 Italics indicates did not play.
  denotes substituted off.
  denotes substituted on.
 (c)  denotes captain.
  denotes sin bin.

Scorers (ENC)

Try scorers

Points scorers

References

External links
 Deutscher Rugby-Verband - Official Site
 TotalRugby.de German rugby website with news and results
 Germany results at scrum.com

2006–08
2006–07 in German rugby union
2007–08 in German rugby union